Diocese of Alaska may refer to the following ecclesiastical jurisdictions covering Alaska :

 Episcopal Diocese of Alaska
 Orthodox Church in America Diocese of Alaska
 Roman Catholic Diocese of Fairbanks, known prior to its elevation as the Apostolic Vicariate (initially Apostolic Prefecture) of Alaska